Steam trams of the 1880s and 1890s had separate numbers for motors and trailers within each separate system and the unified numbering scheme was not introduced for the electric tramcars until 1890.

Classification
A statewide numbering scheme was required as isolated electric segments became joined and rolling stock interchanged and major maintenance performed at Randwick Tramway Workshops. In 1905 a general alphabetical classification was introduced to the NSW Government Tramways.

In general lettering indicated:
 A and B were given to steam stock
 C through to N (and later O, P and R) to electric cars based on seating capacity. 
 T was planned for trailers but not displayed
 S indicated general service, non-passenger carrying stock
 U for ballast motors
 V for ballast trailers
 W for electric water sprinklers.

New types of electric trams continued to be allocated letters, with the exception of I, Q, Y and Z.

Classes

References

Trams in Sydney